First Portuguese Football Players Fund was an investment fund dedicated for football. Unlike Serie A and Premier League, third-party ownership is allowed in Portugal. Clubs sold part of the economic rights of their current players to the fund for cash to re-invest on new signing. Clubs also partnered with the fund to sign new players. It was set up by First Portuguese SGPS S.A., (which in April 2004 was acquired by Grupo Orey to become a major shareholder, via Football Players Funds Management (Cayman) Limited). and a year later became Orey Financial. The company also set up Football Fund PSV Management BV in 2006 (but never started business) and forest fund as well as other field.

The FC Porto section of the fund increased 37.82% in summer 2004, after Ricardo Carvalho, Paulo Ferreira, Deco and Pedro Mendes were sold by Porto for a total €74 million; the Sporting CP and Boavista sections that year, meanwhile, were minus 8.87% and minus 3% respectively.

The fund closed in January 2008 after a new FIFA Regulation on the Status and Transfer of Players came in force on 1 January 2008, which the article 18bis wrote: "No club shall enter into a contract which enables any other party to that contract or any third party to acquire the ability to influence in employment and transfer-related matters its independence, its policies or the performance of its teams."

Porto players 
The follow transaction were known:

Sporting CP players

Boavista players

References

See also
Third-party ownership in association football

Association football organizations